Thaumatogelis is a genus of parasitoid wasps belonging to the family Ichneumonidae. The species of this genus are found in Europe.

Species
The following species are recognised in the genus Thaumatogelis:
 Thaumatogelis alecto Vas, 2018 
 Thaumatogelis aloiosa Schwarz, 2001 
 Thaumatogelis anticecinctus (Strobl, 1901)
 Thaumatogelis asiaticus Schwarz, 2001  
 Thaumatogelis audax (Olivier, 1792) 
 Thaumatogelis clavatus Schwarz, 2001  
 Thaumatogelis femoralis (Brischke, 1881) 
 Thaumatogelis fragosus Schwarz, 2001
 Thaumatogelis fuscus (Duchaussoy, 1915) 
 Thaumatogelis gallicus (Seyrig, 1928)  
 Thaumatogelis improvisus Schwarz, 2001   
 Thaumatogelis inexspectatus Schwarz, 2001  
 Thaumatogelis innoxius Schwarz, 2001 
 Thaumatogelis jonathani Schwarz, 2001   
 Thaumatogelis lapidarius (Seyrig, 1926) 
 Thaumatogelis lichtensteini (Pfankuch, 1913) 
 Thaumatogelis megaera Vas, 2018  
 Thaumatogelis mediterraneus (Ceballos, 1925)
 Thaumatogelis mingetshauricus (Bogacev, 1946) 
 Thaumatogelis neesii (Forster, 1850)   
 Thaumatogelis nuani Schwarz, 2001   
 Thaumatogelis numidicus (Thomson, 1885)
 Thaumatogelis pallens Schwarz, 2001
 Thaumatogelis pilosus (Capron, 1888)  
 Thaumatogelis rhodensis Schwarz, 2001  
 Thaumatogelis robustus (Seyrig, 1926)
 Thaumatogelis rufipes (Strobl, 1901)  
 Thaumatogelis rufus (Pfankuch, 1914)  
 Thaumatogelis santschii (Duchaussoy, 1915)
 Thaumatogelis sardous Schwarz, 2001  
 Thaumatogelis sylvicola (Forster, 1850)
 Thaumatogelis tisiphone Vas & Schwarz, 2018 
 Thaumatogelis vulpinus (Gravenhorst, 1815)

References

Ichneumonidae
Ichneumonidae genera